Robert Joseph Cunningham (born June 18, 1943) is an American prelate of the Roman Catholic church who served as bishop of the Diocese of Syracuse in Upstate New York from 2009 to 2019.  He previously served as bishop of the Diocese of Ogdensburg in Northern New York from 2004 to 2009.

Biography

Early life and education
Robert Cunningham was born on June 18, 1943, in Buffalo, New York to Cecil and Grace Cunningham; he has a brother, Patrick, and a sister, Eileen. He attended St. John the Baptist Parish School and the Diocesan Preparatory Seminary, then entered St. John Vianney Seminary in East Aurora, New York.  He received his Bachelor of Arts and Master of Divinity degrees from St. John Vianney.

Ordination and ministry
Cunningham was ordained to the priesthood by Bishop Bernard McLaughlin on May 24, 1969, in St. Joseph Cathedral in Buffalo.  After his ordination, Cunningham was assigned as associate pastor at Blessed Sacrament Parish in Kenmore, New York. In 1972, he was named assistant pastor at his home parish of St. John the Baptist, also in Kenmore.

Cunningham became private secretary in 1974 to Bishop Edward Head and assistant chancellor of Buffalo in 1974. Cunningham was sent to the Catholic University of America School of Canon Law, where he earned his Licentiate in Canon Law in 1978. After returning to Buffalo, Cunningham was appointed as a judge of the marriage tribunal and vice-chancellor of the diocese. He was raised by the Vatican to the rank of monsignor in 1984, then appointed full chancellor (1985) and vicar general (1986) by the bishop. Niagara University awarded Cunningham an honorary doctorate in humane letters in 1991.

In 1994, Bishop Head received a complaint from a man who claimed that his son had been sodomized by Donald W. Becker, a diocese priest. Becker had a previous history of sexual abuse complaints, yet was still assigned to a parish.  As vicar general, Cunningham interviewed Becker, who said that he couldn't remember anything, but if he had been intoxicated, something could have happened.  The parent did not request any further action and Cunningham dropped the case.  In 2002, after Becker resigned due to poor health, Cunningham received another sexual abuse complaint against him soon after his resignation, which Cunningham did not investigate.

In January 2002, Cunningham was named pastor of St. Louis Parish in Buffalo. He served as administrator of the diocesan College of Consultors from 2003 to 2004.  Cunningham had board memberships for Christ the King Seminary, Catholic Charities, Baker Victory Services in Buffalo, and the Cantalician Center for Learning in Depew, New York. A charter member of the Kenmore Mercy Hospital Foundation Board, he was given the Sister Mary Mechtilde Memorial Award by the board in 2004.

Bishop of Ogdensburg
On March 9, 2004, Cunningham was appointed the as the thirteenth Bishop of the Diocese of Ogdensburg by Pope John Paul II. He received his episcopal consecration on May 18 2004 from Cardinal Edward Egan, with Archbishop Henry J. Mansell and Bishop Gerald Barbarito serving as co-consecrators, at St. Mary's Cathedral in Ogdensburg.

In 2007, Cunningham was awarded an honorary doctorate in humane letters from St. John's University in Staten Island, New York. He also served on the board of Wadhams Hall Seminary College in Ogdensburg.

Bishop of Syracuse
On April 21, 2009, Pope Benedict XVI named Cunningham as the tenth bishop of the Diocese of Syracuse. He was installed on May 26, 2009. 

In a 2011 deposition, Cunningham made statements about the victims of sex abuse by priests in the Diocese of Syracuse , implying that the victims were "culpable" and "accomplices". In 2015, when those statements became public, Cunningham said he wished he phrased his response differently. "It is obvious that my choice of words should have been better. Bottom line is, I cannot go back and change my words but I can assure you that I did not believe the individual involved in the case was at fault." He also repeatedly reiterated that he doesn't believe children are responsible for being abused.On June 18, 2018, Cunningham submitted his resignation upon reaching the age of 75. Pope Francis accepted his resignation on June 4, 2019. Cunningham served as apostolic administrator of the diocese until Father Douglas Lucia was consecrated a bishop on August 8, 2019.

See also
 

 Catholic Church hierarchy
 Catholic Church in the United States
 Historical list of the Catholic bishops of the United States
 List of Catholic bishops of the United States
 Lists of patriarchs, archbishops, and bishops

References

External links
Diocese of Syracuse

1943 births
Living people
Religious leaders from Buffalo, New York
21st-century Roman Catholic bishops in the United States
Catholic University of America alumni
Roman Catholic bishops of Ogdensburg
Roman Catholic bishops of Syracuse
Catholic University of America School of Canon Law alumni